Ludwik de Delney Misky (1884 – 1938) was a Polish painter in the Post-Impressionistic style.

Biography 
His family was originally from Hungary. After finishing his primary education in Wadowice, he entered the Kraków Academy of Fine Arts in 1902, where his teachers were Florian Cynk, Leon Wyczółkowski, Józef Pankiewicz and  Józef Mehoffer, among others. He also studied philosophy and art history at the Jagellonian University.

After that, he continued his studies in Dresden, Leipzig, Berlin and Vienna. he returned to Kraków in 1907 and took employment as a drawing teacher. Later, he would become a school inspector. In 1925, he was one of the cofounders of "Jednoróg" (Unicorn); an art society that was a precursor to the Kapists. After 1927, he worked for the Board of Trustees of the Kraków School District as head of the department of vocational schools.

For most of his career, he painted landscapes, portraits and still-lifes. In his later years, he concentrated on the graphic arts, including metal and wood engraving. He also designed bookplates and tapestries. The largest collection of his works is in Gorzeń Górny, at the manor house formerly owned by the writer Emil Zegadłowicz.

In addition to his painting, he wrote numerous articles on how to teach drawing, as well as books on the methodology and organization of teaching in general.

Selected paintings

References

External links

Arcadja Auctions: More works by Misky.

1884 births
1938 deaths
20th-century Polish painters
20th-century Polish male artists
Polish landscape painters
Jan Matejko Academy of Fine Arts alumni
People from Nowy Sącz
Polish people of Hungarian descent
Polish male painters